RV Martin Sheen is a sailboat owned and operated by the Sea Shepherd Conservation Society. It is being used as a research vessel to study the  plastic debris and microplastics contamination in the oceans, as well as researching marine oil spills.

The ship was named in honor of the American actor and supporter of Sea Shepherd, Martin Sheen.

See also
 Neptune's Navy, Sea Shepherd boats
 Sea Shepherd Conservation Society operations

References

External links
 Sea Shepherd Fleet

Sea Shepherd Conservation Society ships
1977 ships